Cow on the Moon is a 1959 Yugoslavian cartoon.

Plot
A boy is playing with ball, but the ball gets stuck in a hole. He tries to pull it out and it hits him in the face. Meanwhile, a little girl is building a model spaceship. The girl finds the situation funny. She continues building the model spaceship, but the boy takes it from her hand. He then messes with the girl, teasing her with the model spaceship. He then bounces it on his feet. He then winds the girl’s bow around, making her spin. The boy then tosses the model spaceship into the sky and it crashes into the ground and smashes to peices. The boy, with a smug look on his face, leaves. The girl scowls and ponders her revenge and gets an idea. She goes into a shed and takes a basket and puts a fish bowl and long black socks and gloves in it. She puts the basket on a wagon with wood on it and takes the wagon out. She takes the wagon next to a hill and rotates the background, making the wagon roll onto the top of the hill. She rotates the background back to normal and goes up the hill. She takes the wood off the wagon and starts building a giant model spaceship. The boy, who is relaxing under a tree, sees what is happening and climbs up the tree. He then extends his arms’s fingers, making them look like binoculars. He uses them too see what is going on in detail. He sees the girl with a spaceship. He climbs down the tree and goes up the hill. The girl is on a ladder, painting the rocket in dark blue. The boy folds the ladder into one, planning on the girl to fall off, but instead, the girl cuts the half of the ladder with a saw, making the other part fall down, turning into two peices again. The girl finishes painting and climbs down the ladder. She opens the model spaceship’s door, to reveal a chair. The boy now beleives the model spaceship is a real one. He looks inside and sees a measurer with a clock arm. The clock arm pointed to a picture of the planet earth and on the opposite side is a picture of the moon. The boy then sees the girl carrying some dynamite rods. She kicks a flap on one of the spaceship’s wings, making it open and hitting the boy in the face in the process. She puts one dynamite rod each in the two holes in the flap. She then closes it and goes to the other side of the spaceship, putting the rest in the other flap. The boy holds up one of strings from the dynamite, but the girl slaps his hand. The girl goes to the basket and takes the fish bowl and puts it on her head, like a space helmet. She then enters the spaceship and sits on the chair inside. She then takes a match and lights it. She plans to light the dynamite, but the boy stops her and takes her out. He  then takes the fish bowl off the girl’s head and tries to put it on his head, but it doesn’t fit. The girl then makes a rolling pin with the remaining wood. She then rolls the boy’s head with the rolling pin, making his head fit in the bowl. The boy then gets in the spaceship, lights up the dynamite and closes the door. The dynamite’s smoke dissolves and the girl puts the spaceship on the wagon. The wagon goes down the hill and into a valley. The vibration from the rocky terrain of the valley makes the boy think that rocket is lifting off. The girl then makes spaceship noises, making the boy think that rocket is flying. The clock arm on the measurer begins to rotate, making the boy’s belief bigger, but it was the girl rotating a knob, making the clock arm rotate. The wagon then rolls down into a quarry. The girl rotates the knob more, making it point to the picture of the moon. The girl then hops off the wagon and takes the rocket off. She also takes the basket. The boy sees the clock arm pointed to the picture of the moon. He is excited to be there. A cow then walks by and looks at the rocket. The girl takes the wagon behind some rocks and takes a pot with two holes that look like eyes out of the basket. She then takes a wire out of the basket and puts it on the top of the pot, she then bends it, making it look like an antenna. She then puts it on her head. She takes out a small telescope out of the basket and takes it apart. She puts the two peices in the pot’s holes. She then puts on large and long black socks and gloves. She is supposed to look like an alien. The cow investigates the rocket. The boy hears the cow from outside and is scared. He then peeks out the door and sees one of the eyes of the cow. He then quickly closes the door.  He then believes that an alien with a big eye is next to the rocket. He then peeks his hand outside and touches the cow’s tail. He then quickly takes his hand inside and thinks the alien has fur. The cow sees the girl dressed up as an alien and runs away, terrified. The girl then scares the cow some more. The cow climbs up a tree to hide from the alien. The girl opens the spaceship’s door. The boy looks out, with the girl hiding behind the spaceship. The boy steps out of the rocket and looks around. With the girl being in the opposite of his side. He then goes behind the rocket with the girl following him. They then step backwards from behind and the boy bumps into the girl. He screams and faints. The girl wakes the boy and he scowers and runs away, climbing up the same tree the cow climbed up. The boy screams when he sees the cow and almost falls down, but holds on the cow’s tail, dangling on it. The girl tries to catch the boy, but he dangles and tries to move away. The girl then grabs the boy’s feet and he screams. The cow tries to get the boy off it’s tail. The cow pulls on it’s tail, shaking the boy. The girl climbs up the tree. The cow points to the girl, thinking that the alien is coming after them. The cow and boy fall off the tree. The cow runs away with the boy holding on to it. The girl holds on the cow’s tail, but the boy pulls it, making the girl fall off. She takes her bow off and holds it like a carpet. The cow sees the red carpet and charges to it, like a bull. The cow rushes by and the girl hops on. The girl keeps scaring the boy and he falls onto the cow’s head, holding on it. The girl sees the cow is about to fall of an edge and pulls on it’s tail, steering the cow towards the hill. The cow climbs up the hill and down, going by where the girl was building the miniature model spaceship and throws the boy off it’s face. The girl also hops on the table. The boy gets his shirt caught in a tree branch. Dangling from it. He sees the broken spaceship model and realizes he was on earth the whole time. The cow peeks from behind a tree. The girl takes off her costume and reveals herself. The boy is surprised.

The film ends with the cow laughing and being amused by the whole situation.

External links
 
 Krava na mjesecu on YouTube

1959 films
1959 animated films
1950s animated short films
Yugoslav animated short films
Films directed by Dušan Vukotić
Zagreb Film films
Croatian animated short films
1959 independent films
Animated films without speech